Yang Zhicheng (30 November 1903 – 3 February 1967) was a general in the People's Liberation Army of China. He was a member of the Standing Committee of the 3rd National People's Congress.

Biography

Early life and education
Yang was born Yang Xuqing into a Kam people family in Sansui County, Guizhou, on 30 November 1930. In 1919 he attended Guizhou A-type Agricultural School, and participated in the parade of Guizhou students in support of the May Fourth Movement. He joined the Yunnan-Guizhou United Army after graduation. In March 1926, he was admitted to the Republic of China Military Academy and joined the Communist Youth League of China under the introduction of Zhou Yiqun, and became a member of the Chinese Communist Party in March the next year. Soon after he took part in the Nanchang Uprising. In April of the same year, he went to Jinggang Mountains with Zhu De and Chen Yi and served as company commander of the 28th Regiment of the 4th Army of the Workers and Peasants Revolutionary Army. He was seriously injured during the counter-encirclement and suppression campaign. He took part in the Long March in October 1934.

Second Sino-Japanese War
In June 1937, Yang served as a commander, and later became head of the School Affairs Department of the Counter-Japanese Military and Political University. In 1938, he went to the Soviet Union to cure diseases. Afterwards, he studied in the Party School of the Far East Bureau of the Soviet Communist Party and the Frunze Military Academy.

Chinese Civil War
In January 1946, he returned to China with Li Lisan. In February 1946, he served as political commissar of the General Logistics Department of the Northeast Democratic United Army, organizing the logistics supply for the Siping campaign. In May 1948, he served as head of the newly established Quartermaster Production Department of the Northeast Military Region, responsible for the material support of the Liaoshen campaign and the Pingjin campaign. He was head of the Quartermaster Production Department of the Fourth Field Army and Central China Military Region in May 1949, in addition to serving as head of Light Industry of the Central South Military Commission.

PRC era
In August 1950, the  Quartermaster Production Department of the Central South Military Region was merged into its Logistics Department, and Yang became head of the Logistics Department of the Central South Military Region. In September 1954, he was appointed as deputy head of the Supervision Department of the Armed Forces of the People's Liberation Army. He was awarded the military rank of general (shangjiang)  by Chairman Mao Zedong in 1955. He was made vice president of the PLA Academy of Military Sciences in May 1958. He took up the post of vice president of the PLA Higher Military Academy which he held from September 1962 to February 1967, although he remained vice president of the PLA Academy of Military Sciences until September 1963. 

On 3 February 1967, he died from an illness in Beijing, at the age of 63.

References

1903 births
1967 deaths
People from Sansui County
Kam people
Republic of China Military Academy alumni
People's Liberation Army generals from Guizhou
People's Republic of China politicians from Guizhou
Chinese Communist Party politicians from Guizhou
Members of the Standing Committee of the 3rd National People's Congress